Erik Daniel (born 4 February 1992) is a Czech professional footballer who plays as a winger for Spartak Trnava.

In February 2020, it was announced that Daniel, as an ethnic Slovak, had applied for Slovakian citizenship, which would make him eligible to represent the country on international level.

Spartak Myjava
In February 2013, he came to Spartak Myjava, on a half-year loan from Slovan Liberec.

Honours
Slovan Bratislava
Fortuna Liga: 2019–20, 2020–21 
Slovnaft Cup: 2019–20, 2020–21

References

External links
 Slovan Liberec profile
 

1992 births
Living people
Czech people of Slovak descent
People from Hodonín
Czech footballers
Czech expatriate footballers
Association football midfielders
FC Slovan Liberec players
Spartak Myjava players
MFK Ružomberok players
ŠK Slovan Bratislava players
Zagłębie Lubin players
Czech First League players
Slovak Super Liga players
Ekstraklasa players
Expatriate footballers in Slovakia
Czech expatriate sportspeople in Slovakia
Expatriate footballers in Poland
Czech expatriate sportspeople in Poland
Sportspeople from the South Moravian Region
FC Spartak Trnava players